The Certificate in Investment Performance Measurement (CIPM) is a professional accreditation in the field of investment performance analysis.  It includes investment performance measurement and attribution. It is offered by the CIPM Association, a body associated with the CFA Institute.

Professional accreditation
Historically, global investment firms have been subject to a diverse patchwork of laws, regulations, and market customs that dictate how investment performance results can be measured and advertised.  For example, the well-known warning that "past investment returns may not be predictive of future investment returns", has long been encouraged in advertisements for managed funds by regulators such as the U.S. Securities and Exchange Commission (SEC).

Recognising that there was likely to be continuous growth in the worldwide patchwork of regulation covering investment return calculations and advertising, the global investment management industry has agreed on a set of standards known as the Global Investment Performance Standards (GIPS).
 
The GIPS standards relate to the following issues:

Candidates for the CIPM qualification must adhere to the same body of professional ethics and professional conduct that has been devised for Chartered Financial Analysts by the CFA Institute.  To obtain the Certificate, one must sequentially pass two examinations (known respectively as Principles and Expert).  The content of each of these examinations includes 13% on ethics and professional standards.  A certain level of practical experience is also required before obtaining the certificate.  After obtaining the Certificate, Certificate-holders are required to engage in continuing education, and to file a Professional Conduct Statement (PCS) annually.  Misconduct can render a certificate-holder liable to professional discipline.

Trademarks
GIPS, CFA, and CIPM are registered trademarks of the CFA Institute.

Historical pass rates

References

External links
CIPM Association web site
GIPS Standards web site
History of the GIPS Standards
What is CIPM?

Investment management
Professional certification in finance